Sleaford, South Australia is a locality.

Sleaford, South Australia may also refer to.

Hundred of Sleaford, a cadastral unit
Sleaford Bay, a bay
Sleaford Mere, a lake or a mere

See also
Sleaford (disambiguation)
Sleaford Mere Conservation Park